Neighborhoods in Columbus may refer to:

Neighborhoods in Columbus, Ohio
Neighborhoods in Columbus, Georgia